The men's national basketball team of the United States won the gold medal at the 1996 Summer Olympics in Atlanta, Georgia. Led by Basketball Hall of Fame head coach Lenny Wilkens, the team won gold for the second straight Olympics. Nicknamed Dream Team III, the team included five players who were Olympic teammates on the original "Dream Team", from the 1992 Olympic basketball tournament: Charles Barkley, Karl Malone, Scottie Pippen, John Stockton, and David Robinson.  Gary Payton was a late replacement for the injured Glenn Robinson

Roster
With Michael Jordan intimating in 1994 that he would pass on the opportunity to participate in his third Olympic Games (previously in 1984 and 1992 (the Dream Team)) to "let others get their chance at a gold medal," USA Basketball officials sought to construct the team dubbed Dream Team III (Dream Team II was the moniker of the lesser-known 1994 USA Men's Basketball World Championship Team) with a winning combination of veteran players from the 1992 Dream Team that won the gold medal in Barcelona, and some of the league's best young talent. 
 
When the first ten players of the 1996 United States Men's National Basketball Team roster were announced in the summer of 1995, that young talent, and first-time Olympians, included the likes of Anfernee "Penny" Hardaway, Grant Hill, Shaquille O'Neal, and Gary Payton, who was added as a replacement for an injured Glenn "Big Dog" Robinson. Other veteran players who were first-time Olympians were Reggie Miller, Hakeem Olajuwon, and, Mitch Richmond, who was added in April 1996 along with Charles Barkley, completing the roster as the eleventh and twelfth members. Thus, the holdovers from the 1992 Olympic Team, Karl Malone, Scottie Pippen, David Robinson, John Stockton, and Charles Barkley, coupled with the first-time Olympians, formed the 1996 United States Men's National Basketball Summer Olympic team roster.

Staff

Head coach: Lenny Wilkens (Atlanta Hawks)
Assistant coaches: Jerry Sloan (Utah Jazz), Bobby Cremins (Georgia Tech), and Clem Haskins (University of Minnesota)
Team physicians: Steve Haas (Washington Bullets), John A. Hefferon (Chicago Bulls), and Bruce Moseley (Houston Rockets)
Athletic trainers: Steven Brace (Creighton University) and Ron Culp (Miami Heat)

1996 USA results
 beat , 96–68
 beat , 87–54
 beat , 104–82
 beat , 133–70
 beat , 102–71
 beat , 98–75 (quarterfinals)
 beat , 101–73 (semifinals)
 beat  FR Yugoslavia, 95–69 (gold-medal game)

1996 Olympic standings

1.  (8–0)
2.  FR Yugoslavia (7–1)
3.  (5–3)
4.  (5–3)
5.  (5–3)
6.  (3–5)
7.  (4–4)
8.  (2–6)
9.  (3–4)
10.  (2–5)
11.  (1–6)
12.  (0–7)

References

External links
 USA Basketball, official site

United States at the Olympic men's basketball tournament
United States
Olympics